The 1950 Tour de Suisse was the 14th edition of the Tour de Suisse cycle race and was held from 24 June to 1 July 1950. The race started and finished in Zürich. The race was won by Hugo Koblet.

General classification

References

1950
Tour de Suisse
1950 Challenge Desgrange-Colombo